Selina Solman (born 8 February 1994) is a Vanuatuan cricketer and the current captain of the Vanuatu women's cricket team. She was the first female cricketer from Vanuatu to play grade cricket in Australia. She also played for the East Asia-Pacific team in the Australian Country Cricket Championships, with the International Cricket Council (ICC) saying she was a "crucial player for the team".

In April 2019, she was named as the captain of Vanuatu's squad for the 2019 ICC Women's Qualifier EAP tournament, also held in Vanuatu. She made her Women's Twenty20 International (WT20I) debut for Vanuatu against Papua New Guinea in the Women's Qualifier EAP tournament on 6 May 2019.

As well as cricket, Solman has also represented Vanuatu in netball at the 2017 Pacific Mini Games. She is one of the few individuals to become a dual national sport representative for the nation.

References

External links
 

1994 births
Living people
Vanuatuan women cricketers
Vanuatu women Twenty20 International cricketers
Netball players
Place of birth missing (living people)